Lingani is a surname. Notable people with the surname include:
 
Hassan Lingani (born 1987), Ivorian footballer
Jean-Baptiste Boukary Lingani (died 1989), Burkinabé army officer
Jean-Noël Lingani (born 1988), Burkinabé footballer